Cayo Fragoso is an island off the north coast of Cuba. It has a total area of 101 square kilometers and belongs to the Sabana-Camagüey Archipelago, and administratively belongs to the municipality of Caibarién, Villa Clara Province.

See also
 Cayo Santa María
 Cayo Fragoso Lighthouse

References 

Fragoso
Beaches of Cuba
Caibarién
Geography of Villa Clara Province